Mapleton is an unincorporated community in Stark County, in the U.S. state of Ohio.

History
A post office called Mapleton was established in 1837, and remained in operation until 1906. Besides the post office, Mapleton had two churches, a hotel, schoolhouse, and several country stores.

References

Unincorporated communities in Stark County, Ohio
Unincorporated communities in Ohio